Zuzana Váleková (born 23 August 1979) is a former Slovak tennis player.

Váleková won two singles and 19 doubles titles on the ITF circuit in her career. On 13 April 1998, she reached her best singles ranking of world number 204. On 1 November 1999, she peaked at world number 96 in the doubles rankings.

Váleková retired from tennis in 2002.

Career statistics

Singles Finals: 9 (2-7)

Doubles Finals: 31 (19-12)

References 
 

1979 births
Living people
Slovak female tennis players